NK Karlovac 1919 is a Croatian football club based in the town of Karlovac. Karlovac plays their home matches at Stadion Branko Čavlović-Čavlek.

History
Traditionally lower-level minnows, the club's most successful period in the Yugoslav football league system was in the 1970s when they competed in the Yugoslav Second League. After the breakup of Yugoslavia and the formation of the Croatian football league system in 1992 Karlovac spent most of the time playing in Druga HNL and Treća HNL, second and third levels.

Led by manager Igor Pamić, Karlovac won consecutive promotions in the 2007–08 and 2008–09 seasons, which saw them join the top level for the first time in their history. After a sixth-place finish in debut season in 1. HNL and equally good second season, financial troubles during 2011–12 season hit Karlovac hard. They faced relegation to second division but due to financial irregularities, Karlovac was suspended by Croatian Football Federation.

In summer of 2012, NK Karlovac 1919 was founded as a successor club but the two clubs' track records and honors are kept separate by the Croatian Football Federation.

Former names
Founded in 1919 as NK Borac, they changed their name in 1920 to NŠK Karlovac. This lasted until 1941 when they merged with several local sides to form ŠK Velebit. Following World War II Velebit was disbanded and re-established as FD Udarnik, which was then renamed in 1948 SD Slavija before adopting their current name NK Karlovac in 1954.

Borac (1919–1920)
NŠK Karlovac (1920–1941)
HŠK Velebit (1941–1945)
Udarnik (1945–1948)
Slavija (1948–1954)
Karlovac (1954–1958)
KSD (1958–1960)
Karlovac (1960–2012)

Honours
Druga HNL
Runners-up (1): 2008–09
Treća HNL – Center:
Winners (1): 2004–05
Treća HNL – West:
Winners (1): 2007–08

Recent seasons

Key

Top scorer shown in bold when he was also top scorer for the division.

P = Played
W = Games won
D = Games drawn
L = Games lost
F = Goals for
A = Goals against
Pts = Points
Pos = Final position

1. HNL = Prva HNL
2. HNL = Druga HNL
3. HNL = Treća HNL

PR = Preliminary round
R1 = Round 1
R2 = Round 2
QF = Quarter-finals
SF = Semi-finals
RU = Runners-up
W  = Winners

Managers
 Igor Pamić (2007–2011)
 Srećko Lušić (Mar 2011 – Sept 2011)
 Damir Petravić (Sep 2011 – Dec 2011)
 Krešimir Ganjto (Jan 2012 – Mar 2012)
 Sanjin Lucijanić (Mar 2012 – May 2012)

References

 
Football clubs in Croatia
Football clubs in Karlovac County
Football clubs in Yugoslavia
Association football clubs established in 1919
1919 establishments in Croatia
Sport in Karlovac
Association football clubs disestablished in 2012
Defunct football clubs in Croatia
2012 disestablishments in Croatia